Ryan Jenkins may refer to:

Ryan Jenkins (entrepreneur) (1977–2009), Canadian reality show contestant and real estate entrepreneur, suspected killer of Jasmine Fiore
Ryan Jenkins (baseball) (born 1987),  American college baseball coach